Strobilanthes wallichii, commonly known as Kashmir acanthus, hardy Persian shield, wild petunia, or kandali, is a herbaceous perennial which is native to the Himalayas. In its natural habitat, it purple blooms appear only once every twelve years, an occasion which is celebrated by the Kandali Festival in the Pithoragarh District in India.

Synonyms include:
Pteracanthus alatus (Wall. ex Nees) Bremek.
Ruellia alata Wall. ex Nees
Strobilanthes atropurpureus Nees

References

External links
Flowers of India: Strobilanthes wallichii

wallichii
Flora of Bangladesh
Flora of Nepal
Flora of West Himalaya
Environment of Himachal Pradesh